General Robinson may refer to:

Alfred Robinson (British Army officer) (1894–1978), British Army major general
Brian S. Robinson, U.S. Air Force lieutenant general and deputy commander of the Air Mobility Command
David Robinson (1754–1842), Vermont soldier active in the American Revolution
David A. Robinson (born 1954), U.S. Air Force major general
Fred D. Robinson Jr.  (fl. 1970s–2000s), U.S. Army major general
Frederick Philipse Robinson (1763–1852), British soldier in the American Revolutionary War and the War of 1812
James S. Robinson (1827–1892), U.S. Representative from Ohio and Union Army general in the American Civil War
John C. Robinson (1817–1897), Union Army general in the American Civil War
Lori Robinson (c. 1959–), U.S. Air Force general and commander of USNORTHCOM and NORAD
Ray A. Robinson (1896–1976), U.S. Marine Corps officer active in World Wars I and II
Roscoe Robinson Jr. (1928–1993), first African-American four-star general in the U.S. Army
Wallace H. Robinson (1920–2013), U.S. Marine Corps general and quartermaster general
William Robinson Jr. (1785–1868), Pennsylvania politician, businessman and militia general

See also
Henry Robinson-Montagu, 6th Baron Rokeby (1798–1883), British Army general
Attorney General Robinson (disambiguation)